Zhang Yu may refer to:

 Zhang Yu (actress) (张瑜; born 1957), Chinese film actress
 Zhang Yu (basketball) (张瑜; born 1986), Chinese basketball player
 Zhang Yu (footballer, born 1994) (张瑀), Chinese footballer
 Zhang Yu (footballer, born 2001) (张禹), Chinese footballer
 Zhang Yu (general) (張玉; 1343–1401), Ming dynasty general
 Zhang Yu (hurdler) (张瑜; born 1971), Chinese hurdler
 Zhang Yu (Nanhe) (張裕; died 219), courtesy name Nanhe, official serving under the Eastern Han dynasty warlord Liu Bei
 Zhang Yu (sport shooter) (born 2000), Chinese sports shooter
 Zhang Yu (tennis) (born 1976), Chinese tennis player
 Zhang Yu (voice actress) (张昱; born 1988), Chinese voice actress known for Overwatch
 Zhang Yu (volleyball) (张宇; born 1995), Chinese volleyball player

See also
 
 Phil Chang (張宇; born 1967), Taiwanese singer-songwriter
 Yu Chang (張育成; born 1995), Taiwanese baseball player
 Chang Yu (disambiguation)